Singapore participated in the 1998 Asian Games held in Bangkok, Thailand from December 6, 1998 to December 20, 1998. Athletes from Singapore succeeded in winning two golds, three silvers and nine bronzes, making total fourteen medals. Singapore finished seventeenth in a medal table.

Medalists

References

Nations at the 1998 Asian Games
1998
Asian Games